The Witch-Cult in Western Europe is a 1921 anthropological book by Margaret Murray, published at the height of the success of Frazer's Golden Bough. Certain university circles subsequently celebrated Margaret Murray as the expert on western witchcraft, though her theories were widely discredited. Over the period 1929-1968, she wrote the "Witchcraft" article in successive editions of the Encyclopædia Britannica.

In 1962, The Witch-Cult in Western Europe was reprinted by Oxford University Press. Murray's theory, also known as the witch-cult hypothesis, suggests that the accusations made towards "witches" in Europe were in fact based on a real, though clandestine, pagan religion that worshiped a horned god.

Overview

Thesis 

In this book and the subsequent The God of the Witches (1931), Murray explained her theory as follows.

 Until the 17th century there was a religion, much older than Christianity, which all over Western Europe had supporters both among ordinary people and the ruling classes.
 Central to the worship stood a horned god with two faces, known to the Romans as Janus or Dianus. (This cult of Dianus was of the type James Frazer described in detail in The Golden Bough).
 The horned god represented the cycle of seasons and harvests. It was believed that he died and periodically returned to life.
 On earth, the horned god was represented by chosen human beings. There were some celebrities among them, such as William Rufus, Thomas Becket, Joan of Arc and Gilles de Rais. They each died a tragic death as a ritual sacrifice to insure the resurrection of the god and the renewal of the earth.
 In the villages, the witches’ meetings were presided over by the horned god. Christian observers of these events might have thought the witches were worshiping the devil, when in reality they were celebrating the pre-Christian god Dianus.
 The preservation of this ancient religion was entrusted to a variety of indigenous peoples, small in stature, who were driven out from their land with each new invasion. This would also explain the stories about fairies, gnomes and other ‘small people’. These creatures were very shy but were able to pass the knowledge of their religion to ordinary people. The witches were their pupils and thus the heirs of the ancient religion.
 According to Murray, local covens consisted of thirteen members: twelve ordinary men and women, and an officer. All members were required to hold a weekly meeting (named 'esbat' by Murray) and to attend the larger Sabbats.
 There was a strict discipline in the covens, and whoever missed a meeting could be severely punished and was sometimes put to death.
 The organization and structure were so good that Christianity had to wait until the Reformation before taking wide notice of the hidden religion. The great witch persecutions were thus Chrisianity's attack on a powerful rival.

Origins
Murray's Witch-cult hypothesis was preceded by a similar idea proposed by the German Professor Karl Ernst Jarcke in 1828. Jarcke's hypothesis claimed that the victims of the early modern witch trials were not innocents caught up in a moral panic, but members of a previously unknown pan-European pagan religion which had pre-dated Christianity, been persecuted by the Christian Church as a rival religion, and finally driven underground, where it had survived in secret until being revealed in the confessions of those accused in the witch trials. The idea was later endorsed by German historian Franz Josef Mone and French historian Jules Michelet. In the late 19th century, variations on the witch cult hypothesis were adopted by two Americans, Matilda Joslyn Gage and Charles Leland, the latter of whom promoted it in his 1899 book Aradia, or the Gospel of the Witches.

Interpretation of witch trial evidence
Murray was interested in ascribing naturalistic or religious/ceremonial explanations to some of the more fantastical descriptions found in early modern witch trial records. Murray suggested, based in part on the work of James Frazer in The Golden Bough, that the witches accused in the trials worshiped a pre-Christian god associated with forests and the natural world. Murray identified this god as Janus (or Dianus, following Frazer's suggested etymology), who she described as a "Horned God" of the wilds in order to explain descriptions of a horned Satan provided by witch trial confessions. Because those accused of witchcraft often described witches meetings as involving sexual orgies with Satan, she suggested that a male priest representing Dianus would have been present at each coven meeting, dressed in horns and animals skins, who engaged in sexual acts with the gathered women. Murray further interpreted descriptions of sexual intercourse with Satan as being cold and painful to mean that the priest would often use artificial implements on the witches when he became too exhausted to continue. Unlike most modern forms of religious witchcraft, Murray's conception of the witch-cult was therefore strictly patriarchal. In her hypothesis, witches worshiped a single god, and though a female figure in a role known as "the Maiden" would be present at coven gatherings, Murray did not consider her to represent a goddess. In this way, Murray's hypothesis, which had been based primarily of her interpretations of witch trial records, differed strongly from Leland's belief in a goddess-centered witch-cult focused on Diana and Aradia, derived from supposed rural Italian folk practices.

One key aspect of Murray's witch-cult hypothesis, later adopted by Wicca, was the idea that not only were historical accounts of witches based in truth, but witches had originally been involved in benevolent fertility -related functions rather than malevolent hexing and cursing as traditionally portrayed. In examining testimony from the early modern witch trials, Murray encountered numerous examples of the kinds of curses and nefarious activities the accused people confessed to. Seeking to fit these into a framework in which descriptions of witchcraft had both a natural and pagan-religious explanation, Murray posited that these malevolent actions were actually twisted interpretations of benevolent actions, altered either under duress during the trials, or by practitioners themselves who had, over the years, forgotten or changed the "original" intent of their practices. For example, Murray interpreted Isobel Gowdie's confession to cursing a farm field by setting loose a toad pulling a miniature plough as originally having been not a curse on the field as Gowdie stated, but a means of ensuring fertility of the crops. Murray stated that these acts were "misunderstood by the recorders and probably by the witches themselves."

With these kinds of interpretations, Murray created for the first time the idea of the witch as a practitioner of good magic and religious rites to ensure fertility of people and the land. This ran counter to all previous ideas about what witchcraft was in history and folklore - even Leland's variant of the witch-cult hypothesis in Aradia depicted witches as not fully benevolent, but rather as revolutionary figures who would use cursing and black magic to exact revenge on their enemies, the upper classes, and the Catholic Church.

Murray combined testimony from several witch trials to arrive at the idea that witches met four times per year at coven meetings or "Sabbaths". She also used one piece of testimony to arrive at the conclusion that covens were usually composed of 13 witches, led by a male priest who would dress in animal skins, horns, and fork-toed shoes to denote his authority (the dress was assumed to be a naturalistic explanation for accused witch's descriptions of Satan). According to Murray, the traditional name for coven gatherings, "Sabbath", was derived from s'esbattre, meaning "to frolic". Most historians disagree, arguing instead that the organizers of the witch trials adopted terms predominantly associated with Judaism, including "Sabbath", in order to denigrate witches as the equivalent to Jews, who were also highly denigrated in mainstream European culture during this period. In fact, many witch trial accounts used not only "Sabbath" but also "synagogue" in reference to gatherings of witches.

Reception 
The idea of a witch cult that until early modern times managed to survive was quickly dismissed by historians.
From the 1920s on, Murray's theory was assailed by real historians such as George Lincoln Burr, Hugh Trevor-Roper and more recently by Keith Thomas. Most mainstream folklorists, including most of Murray's contemporaries, did not take her hypothesis seriously. Rather than accept Murray's naturalistic explanation for the magical feats and rituals ascribed to witches during the early modern trials, other scholars argued that the entire scenario was always fictitious and did not require a naturalistic explanation. The supposed details of the rituals and witchcraft practices described in trial records were simply invented by victims under torture or threat of torture, based on the kinds of diabolic rites that clergy of the time would have expected to hear about. Almost all of Murray's peers regarded the witch-cult theory as incorrect and based on poor scholarship. Modern scholars have noted that Murray was highly selective in the evidence she pulled from trial accounts, favoring details that supported her theory and ignoring details that clearly had no naturalistic analogue. Murray often contradicted herself within her own books, citing accounts in one chapter as evidence for naturalistic explanations while using exactly the same passages to argue opposite points in the next.

Modern scholars of the history of witchcraft agree that it is very unlikely that such a witch-cult really existed, or that this cult or religion came to an end because the Christian church wanted to eradicate the followers of a pagan tradition. One of these modern critics, social anthropologist Alan Macfarlane criticized Murray's work in his book Witchcraft Prosecutions in Essex, 1500-1600: A Sociological Analysis. He says that his main criticism on Murray's work is that she erroneously jumbled together all sorts of European folklore out of context. He argued that she had taken the things that people believed as factual evidence. From his own research on witchcraft in Essex, Macfarlane found no traces of a Sabbath, Coven or the demonic pact, except perhaps in the witch trials of 1645, nor of any pagan underground cult or any group calling themselves witches. Likewise Keith Thomas criticises Murray for her selective use of evidence and 'the deficiencies of her historical method'.

A few scholars, however, argued that despite the exaggerated claims Murray made, there could be some truth in her hypothesis. Arno Rune Berg noted in his 1947 book Witches, Demons and Fertility a number of "ordinary" elements that were cited in descriptions of the witches' Sabbath. This could be an indication there had actually been meetings, which would have transformed into phantasmagoria later, under the influence of the imagination.

Though most late 20th and early 21st century historians have been critical of Murray's ideas and methods, a few credit her hypothesis with least a bit of underlying truth. Emmanuel Le Roy Ladurie, for example, argued that while most of Murray's arguments were "near nonsense", he also pointed to Carlo Ginzburg's discovery in the 1960s of the Italian benandanti, folk magicians who practiced anti-witchcraft magic and were themselves put on trial for witchcraft, as evidence that in at least some cases, the accusations of the witch trial organizers were not based entirely on panicked fantasy. Ginzburg himself distanced himself from Murray's hypothesis, though he also argued that the benandanti were a continuation of a pre-Christian shamanic tradition, an assertion which has itself been criticized by other scholars as lacking solid evidence.

Influence  
Despite criticisms of her work, Murray was invited to write the entry on "witchcraft" for the 1929 edition of the Encyclopædia Britannica, which was reprinted for decades, last appearing in the 1969 edition. Rather than write an article that reflected the historical consensus on the witch trials, Murray used the opportunity to promote her own hypothesis in the Encyclopædia, presenting it as fact. According to folklorist Jacqueline Simpson, Murray's ideas became "so entrenched in popular culture that they will probably never be uprooted." 

Charles Leland's idea of an 'old religion' and Murray's surviving pagan cult would inspire subsequent 20th century modern witchcraft movements like Wicca, and they heavily influenced writers such as Robert Graves, whose book The White Goddess also influenced Wicca.

Feminist scholars have also taken up a variant on Murray's thesis about persecuted witches in Medieval Europe as members of a religion; not one centering on a Horned God, but rather a cult of the Mother Goddess which supposedly originated in the Paleolithic era.

References

External links 

 Full text of The Witch-Cult in Western Europe at the Internet Archive

1921 non-fiction books
Anthropology literature
European witchcraft